Fulk of Nevers (died 1066), known as Foulques l'Oison (meaning the Goose, the Fool, or the Idiot), was the count of Vendôme from 1028 until his expulsion in 1032 and again from 1056 to his death. He was the second son of Bodon of Nevers and Adela of Anjou.

In 1028, his elder brother, Bouchard II, died and their mother took up the regency for the young Fulk. Half of the county was entrusted to Fulk's care. Unsatisfied, Fulk sought to evict his mother from her half. Adela gave her share to Geoffrey Martel, Count of Anjou. Martel was not long in seizing the whole country. This state continued until 1056, when King Henry I ordered Martel to return the county of Vendôme to Fulk. Fulk was thereafter under the suzerainty of the counts of Anjou.

In his final decade as count, Fulk entered into war with Theobald III of Blois and with the Trinity Abbey, Vendôme.

He was married to Petronilla of Château-Gontier. They had a son and two daughters:
Bouchard III, succeeded in Vendôme
Euphrosine, married Geoffrey III of Preuilly
Agatha, married Ralph Payen, viscount of Vendôme

1066 deaths
Counts of Vendôme
Year of birth unknown